"The Gang Gets Racist" is the premiere episode of the American situation comedy series It's Always Sunny in Philadelphia.  Directed by John Fortenberry and written by Rob McElhenney and Charlie Day, the episode originally aired on FX in the United States on August 4, 2005.

The pilot episode introduces the four characters around which the show revolves: Dennis Reynolds (played by Glenn Howerton), Deandra 'Sweet Dee' Reynolds (played by Kaitlin Olson), Charlie Kelly (played by Charlie Day), and Mac (played by Rob McElhenney).

Plot
Mac, Charlie, and Dennis have an awkward meeting with Sweet Dee's acting class crush, Terrell (Malcolm Barrett), when they find out he is African American. After finding out he is a club promoter, they decide to try to hire him to help Paddy's Pub bring in more customers. While talking about him, Charlie's crush, The Waitress (Mary Elizabeth Ellis), overhears him say something offensive out of context. Charlie and Mac go to a college campus and try to make friends with African American students in an attempt to prove they aren't racist, but Charlie ends up attracting Jennell (Telisha Shaw), one of the African American girls. Meanwhile, the bar sees huge business from Terrell's promotion, but they discover Terrell is gay, and the bar becomes one of the hottest gay bars in the city. Dee and Mac conspire to get Dennis, who is liking the attention from the gay men, drunk, to make it seem as if he has hooked up with one of the gay men, causing him to fire Terrell. Charlie tries to use Jennell to prove to the Waitress he isn't racist, but ends up getting both to hate him. Mac, trying to prove to the gang he isn't racist, ends up being the most offensive of all.

Reception
Vulture's Larry Fitzmaurice said the pilot episode "makes no bones about establishing the show's capacity to offend," observing that it was "impressive to witness in the rearview how much Always Sunny has stayed true to its roots even as it's added embellishment after embellishment." Entertainment Weekly'''s Gillian Flynn panned the show, and said with episodes like "The Gang Gets Racist," Always Sunny was "smug enough to think it's breaking ground, but not smart enough to know it isn't", and that "This type of cynical-naive overearnestness was satirized much more sharply by Neal Pollack's essay "I Am Friends With a Working-Class Black Woman," published in McSweeney's'' way back in 1998."

References

American television series premieres
2005 American television episodes
It's Always Sunny in Philadelphia episodes